NOAAS Peirce (S 328), was an American survey ship that was in commission in the National Oceanic and Atmospheric Administration (NOAA) from 1970 to 1992. Previously, she had been in commission in the United States Coast and Geodetic Survey from 1963 to 1970 as USC&GS Peirce (CSS 28).

After her NOAA decommissioning, she was donated to the Intrepid Sea, Air & Space Museum for use as the floating classroom and archaeological research ship MV Elizabeth M. Foster. She was sold for private use in 1999 and in 2001 became the yacht MV Avedonia.

Construction and commissioning
Peirce was built a cost of $2,300,000 (USD) as a "coastal survey ship" (CSS) for the U.S. Coast and Geodetic Survey by the Marietta Manufacturing Company at Point Pleasant, West Virginia. She was launched in October 1962 and delivered in May 1963. The Coast and Geodetic Survey commissioned her on 6 May 1963 at the Alabama State Docks in Mobile, Alabama, as USC&GS Peirce (CSS 28), the first and only Coast and Geodetic Survey ship of the name. When the Coast and Geodetic Survey and other United States Government agencies merged to form NOAA on 3 October 1970, Peirce became a part of the NOAA fleet as NOAAS Peirce (S 328), thus far the only NOAA ship to bear the name.

Capabilities
Peirce had a two-drum oceanographic winch with a maximum pull of 1,500 pounds (680 kg). The upper drum had  of 0.3-inch (7.62-mm) electrical cable, while the lower drum had  of 5/16-inch (7.9-mm) cable.

For acoustic hydrography and bathymetry, the ship had a deep-water echosounder, a shallow-water echosounder-lOOKhz, and a hydrographic survey sounder. To process data, she had the National Ocean Services Hydrochart system, which employed a PDP/8E computer to acquire and process hydrographic data in real time, generate a real-time position-corrected plot of sounding data, provide steering commands to the helmsman, and generate a punched paper tape for shore-based processing of sounding dara.

Peirce had an ice-strengthened steel hull.

Peirce carried two  aluminum-hulled diesel-powered Jensen survey launches, each equipped with the same Hydrochart system as aboard Peirce. For utility and rescue purposes, she also carried two open boats with gasoline-powered outboard motors, a  Boston Whaler fiberglass-hulled boat and  Monark aluminum-hulled boat.

Operational career
From her home port at Norfolk, Virginia, Peirce conducted hydrographic and bathymetric surveys involving nautical charting and ocean mapping, primarily along the United States East Coast and United States Gulf Coast and off territories of the United States in the Caribbean.

NOAA decommissioned Peirce on 1 May 1992.

Floating classroom and yacht

In 1992, Peirce was donated to the Intrepid Sea, Air & Space Museum in New York City. The museum acquired her for use as a floating classroom and archaeological research ship and renamed her MV Elizabeth M. Fisher in 1993. In 1999 the museum sold her for private use, and in 2000 she returned to the name MV Peirce. By 2001 she was operating as the private yacht MV Avedonia.

See also
NOAA ships and aircraft

References

Ships of the NOAA Fleet, Rockville, Maryland: United States Department of Commerce, June 1989
"NOAA History, Coast & Geodetic Survey Ships", United States Department of Commerce

Ships of the National Oceanic and Atmospheric Administration
Ships of the United States Coast and Geodetic Survey
Motor yachts
Ships built in Point Pleasant, West Virginia
1962 ships